Idols 6 is the sixth season of the Dutch version of Idols hosted by Ruben Nicolai & Lieke van Lexmond. The winner was Julia van Helvoirt with Bram Boender as runner-up.

Summeries

Contestants
(ages stated are at time of contest)
(in order of elimination)
Renee Schnater, 16
Jahlynn Kalkman, 19
Mitch Lodewick, 17
Bram Boender, 20 (runner-up)
Julia van Helvoirt, 23 (winner)

Season 06
2017 Dutch television seasons